Ranchette Estates is a census-designated place (CDP) in Willacy County, Texas, United States. The population was 152 at the 2010 census.

Geography
Ranchette Estates is located at  (26.484386, -97.821953).

According to the United States Census Bureau, the CDP has a total area of 0.6 square mile (1.6 km2), all land. The CDP lost a small portion of its area, the southeast corner below TX-186 prior to the 2010 census.

Demographics
As of the census of 2000, there were 133 people, 32 households, and 28 families residing in the CDP. The population density was 216.7 people per square mile (84.2/km2). There were 33 housing units at an average density of 53.8/sq mi (20.9/km2). The racial makeup of the CDP was 72.93% White, 4.51% Native American, 3.76% Pacific Islander, 12.78% from other races, and 6.02% from two or more races. Hispanic or Latino of any race were 94.74% of the population.

There were 32 households, out of which 71.9% had children under the age of 18 living with them, 68.8% were married couples living together, 15.6% had a female householder with no husband present, and 12.5% were non-families. 12.5% of all households were made up of individuals, and 6.3% had someone living alone who was 65 years of age or older. The average household size was 4.16 and the average family size was 4.54.

In the CDP, the population was spread out, with 45.1% under the age of 18, 12.0% from 18 to 24, 27.8% from 25 to 44, 11.3% from 45 to 64, and 3.8% who were 65 years of age or older. The median age was 20 years. For every 100 females, there were 101.5 males. For every 100 females age 18 and over, there were 87.2 males.

The median income for a household in the CDP was $25,250, and the median income for a family was $25,250. Males had a median income of $26,250 versus $6,250 for females. The per capita income for the CDP was $4,605. There were 48.4% of families and 51.4% of the population living below the poverty line, including 64.5% of those under 18 and none of those over 64.

Education
Ranchette Estates is served by the Raymondville Independent School District.

In addition, South Texas Independent School District operates magnet schools that serve the community.

References

Census-designated places in Willacy County, Texas
Census-designated places in Texas